Eric Bauman or Baumann may refer to:

 Eric Baumann (cyclist) (born 1980), German road bicycle racer
 Eric Baumann (musicologist) (born 1962), German musicologist
Eric Bauman (eBaum), founder of eBaum's World
Eric C. Bauman (born 1958), American politician